Igor Aleksander FREng (born 26 January 1937) is an emeritus professor of Neural Systems Engineering in the Department of Electrical and Electronic Engineering at Imperial College London. He worked in artificial intelligence and neural networks and designed the world's first neural pattern recognition system in the 1980s.

Life and work
Aleksander was educated in Italy and graduated from the University of the Witwatersrand in South Africa, arriving in the UK in the late 1950s, intending to become a research student under Colin Cherry. Instead he found work with Standard Telephones and Cables, later joining Queen Mary College where he gained a PhD, subsequently becoming a lecturer there in 1961. He moved to the University of Kent in 1968 as a reader in Electronics and then to Brunel University as professor in 1974. In 1984 he became professor at Imperial College London as professor of the Management of Information Technology. He was Head of Electrical Engineering and Gabor Professor of Neural Systems Engineering at Imperial College from 1988 to his retirement in 2002. He was elected Fellow of the Royal Academy of Engineering (1988), and he served as Pro-rector of External Relations at Imperial College (1997). In 2005 he presented the Bernard Price Memorial Lecture.

His work centred on the modelling capability of artificial neural networks. He devised neuromodels of the visual system in primates, visuo-verbal system in humans, the effect of anaesthetics on awareness, and artificial consciousness. He inspired the engineering design  of one of the first stand alone neural pattern recognition systems, the WISARD (anonym for Wilkie Stonham Aleksander's Recognition Device) which was named after the co-inventors Bruce Wilkie, John Stonham and Igor Aleksander. This Brunel University prototype WISARD was commercially developed and marketed by Computer Recognition Systems, Wokingham, under the trade name of ’CRS WISARD’ in 1984. After this, the further developments of this system do not appear to have been documented. A popular link for WISARD is that of “the wisard pattern recognition machine” at the Winton Gallery, British Science Museum.

Aleksander received an honorary degree in Computer Engineering from University of Palermo in Jul 2011.

See also
 Artificial consciousness
 Artificial Imagination
 Cybernetics Society
 Journal of Consciousness Studies
 Philosophy of artificial intelligence
 Strong AI
 Superintelligence

Selected publications
Books
 2005, The World in My Mind, My Mind In The World: Key Mechanisms of Consciousness in Humans, Animals and Machines published by Imprint Academic, .
 2000, How to Build a Mind, London: Weidenfeld and Nicolson
 1996, Impossible Minds: My neurons, My Consciousness published by Imperial College Press .
 1975, I.Aleksander, F. Keith Hanna, Automata Theory: An Engineering Approach New York: Crane Russak, London: Edward Arnold. 
 1971, Microcircuit learning computers, London: Mills & Boon Monographs and Technical Library

Articles
 2008, "Machine consciousness", Scholarpedia 3(2):4162.
 2003, "Axioms and Tests for the Presence of Minimal Consciousness in Agents", in: Journal of Consciousness Studies
 1997, Evolutionary Checkers in: Nature, Vol. 402, Dec. 1999, pp. 857–860.
 1997, I. Aleksander, C. Browne, R. Evans, N. Sales, "Conscious and Neural Cognizers: A Review and Some Recent Approaches", in: Neural Networks, Vol. 10, No. 7, pp. 1303–1316.
 1996, N. Sales, R. Evans, I. Aleksander. "Successful naive representation grounding", in: Artificial Intelligence Review, vol. 10, no.1–2, pp. 83–102.
 1994, K. Warwick. "Weightless brains", Review of Neurons and Symbols by Igor Aleksander and Helen Morton, The Times Higher Educational Supplement, p. 31, February (1994)

References

External links
 Artificial Intelligence, 1999-04-29, BBC Radio program In Our Time

1937 births
Academics of Imperial College London
Academics of the University of Kent
Academics of Brunel University London
Artificial intelligence researchers
Cyberneticists
Living people
Fellows of the Royal Academy of Engineering
Alumni of Queen Mary University of London
People associated with The Institute for Cultural Research
Croatian engineers
British computer scientists